Paul Milton Glatzel (born 20 February 2001) is a professional footballer who plays for Tranmere Rovers, on loan from Liverpool, as a striker. Born in England, he has represented both England and Germany at youth level.

Early and personal life
Glatzel was born in Liverpool, England to German parents.

Club career
Glatzel began his career with Liverpool at under-9 level. He captained the under-18 youth team. He signed a new long-term contract with the club in September 2019. He missed the 2019–20 season due to injury, and suffered further injuries in September 2020, and November 2020.

He moved on loan to Tranmere Rovers in July 2021. Glatzel made his professional debut on 7 August 2021, starting in a 1–0 win over Walsall.

He returned to Tranmere on loan on 1 September 2022.

International career
Glatzel played for England at under-15 and under-16 youth levels, but switched to Germany at under-18 level. He made his Germany under-18 debut in a 1–0 win over Cyprus in November 2018, and scored his first youth international goal in the 3–0 win over Belgium in a friendly in May 2019.

Career statistics

References

2001 births
Living people
English people of German descent
English footballers
German footballers
Liverpool F.C. players
Tranmere Rovers F.C. players
English Football League players
Association football forwards
England youth international footballers
Germany youth international footballers